Julia Rose Wilkinson (born June 12, 1987) is a Canadian former competitive swimmer who swam in major international championships.  Wilkinson competed in backstroke, medley and freestyle events.

Career

2008 Olympics
At the 2008 Canadian Olympic Trials, she broke the Canadian national record in the women's 100 m backstroke with her time of 1:01.41, automatically qualifying for the 2008 Summer Olympics. She broke the same record again by swimming it in 1:00.59 at the final swimming meet before the Olympics. Erin Gammel previously held the record with her 1:01.93 time set in 2005. At the 2008 Mel Zajac, Jr. International swim meet in Vancouver, British Columbia, she broke the Canadian record for the 50 m backstroke with her time of 28.53. The record was previously held by Jennifer Carroll, who set it in the 2003 World Championships.

Wilkinson became qualified to compete in the 100 m back, 200 m free, 200 m individual medley, the 4 x 100 and 4 x 200 free, and the 4 x 100 medley relays at the 2008 Summer Olympics. In the 4 × 100 m relay, her team finished 8th, compiling a record time of 3:38:32. She dropped the 200 m freestyle to concentrate on the 200 m individual medley. In the 200 m individual medley, she finished in 7th place, with a time of 2:12.43.

At the 4 × 100 m medley race, she finished in 7th.

2009–2010 Season
In the summer of 2009, Julia represents Canada at the World Championships.

She was named to Canada's Senior National Team for the 2009–2010 season at the Canada Cup opening night in Toronto. She went on to win the 100 free that evening with 54.19 with no shoulder complications after her surgery and recovery last year.

She is returning for her final season as a senior at Texas A&M following her shoulder injury. Wilkinson was instrumental in A&M’s dual victory against Missouri, winning three individual events and swimming the backstroke on the first-place 200 medley relay. She also swam in four winning relays as the Aggies claimed the team title at the Big 12 Relays. She received the Big12 Swimming of the Week Award for her performance. She looked forward to Big12s meetings against main rivals Texas and racing at NCAAs, aiming for an individual title.

She was nominated to carry the Vancouver 2010 Olympic Torch through her hometown of Stratford, Ontario on December 27, 2009. She cited the great support Stratford has given her in reaching her dreams.

At the Big12 Championships in College Station Texas (February 24–27) Wilkinson carried her team to a victory upset against the #3 Texas Longhorns. She was named Outstanding Swimming of the Meet with 6 first-place finishes and 1 second-place finish. The first night, the A&M women brought the crowd to its feet with a winning effort in the 800-yard freestyle relay. The Aggie foursome of senior Kristen Heiss, senior Melissa Hain, freshman Maureen McLaine and senior Julia Wilkinson hit the wall in an NCAA "A" cut of 7:01.63 to edge out the Longhorns (7:02.10). The Aggies trailed the Longhorns by more than a second after 600 yards, but Wilkinson closed with an impressive 1:43.41 split to overtake Texas’ Kathleen Hersey for the win. She continued her dominance in the 200-yard freestyle relay where Aggies trailed after the first 100 yards by .39 of a second, but Woods turned in a third-leg split of 22.20 and Wilkinson went 22.00 on the anchor for the win out-touching Longhorns 1:29.31 to 1:29.45. In the 200 IM, Julia was first in an NCAA "A" cut time of 1:55.81. Continuing on, Julia finished first in the 100 back with a season's best of 52.77 and second in the 400 medley relay in 3:33.91. In the final day of competition, Julia set a new meet record bettering her old time with 47.74 in the 100 free. Then again in the 400 free relay, the foursome of Heiss, Doerge, Woods and Wilkinson hit the wall in a time of 3:15.23. Wilkinson entered the water facing a .66 second deficit, but turned in a 47.27 anchor split for the win. Numerous times Julia beat out Texas Olympian Kathleen Hersey. She finished her career with 20 conference championships and 8 individual titles, one of the highest for a Texas A&M Swimmer.

At the NCAA's Wilkinson became the first National Champion for Texas A&M by winning the 100 free with 47.61 beating out Georgia and California taking second and third. Her win was the first for the Aggies and a second win was followed by Alia Atkinson. Julia showed her dominance at the NCAAs this year by also taking 2nd in the 200 IM and 3rd in the 200 freestyle.

2010 Commonwealth Games

Wilkinson entered in several events at the Commonwealth Games where she successfully earned 2 bronze medals; in the 200m individual medley, and in the 100m backstroke events, respectively. However, in the women's 4 × 100 m freestyle relay final, the Canadian foursome (including Julia) clocked the second fastest time only to learn they had been disqualified due to an illegal takeover—this would have been Wilkinson's third medal in these Games.

2012 Summer Olympics 
Wilkinson swam in the 100 m freestyle, the 100 m backstroke and the 4 x 100 m freestyle and 4 x 100 medley relays.

Personal
Wilkinson attended Texas A&M University, where she majored in communications and was a member of the Texas A&M Aggies women's swimming and diving team. In 2008, she was named the Big 12 Women's Swimmer of the Year.

She was born in Stratford, Ontario.  She is the daughter of Mark (doctor) and Mary (8th grade English teacher) Wilkinson. She has one older sister, Jane, who also swam competitively in university.

References

External links
 Texas A&M bio
December 2008 interview

1987 births
Living people
Canadian female backstroke swimmers
Canadian female medley swimmers
Canadian female freestyle swimmers
Olympic swimmers of Canada
Sportspeople from Stratford, Ontario
Swimmers at the 2008 Summer Olympics
Swimmers at the 2012 Summer Olympics
Texas A&M Aggies women's swimmers
Commonwealth Games bronze medallists for Canada
Swimmers at the 2010 Commonwealth Games
Commonwealth Games medallists in swimming
Medallists at the 2010 Commonwealth Games